Jo Eun-ji (born February 10, 1981) is a South Korean actress. She debuted in the gritty Im Sang-soo film Tears, and has since become better known for her supporting roles on film and television, such as in The President's Last Bang, My Scary Girl, Forever the Moment, The Concubine and The Villainess. She was also the leading actress in the indies Driving with My Wife's Lover, and Sunshine Love.

Personal life
Jo Eun-ji wed Park Jung-min, CEO of talent agency Prain TPC, on May 24, 2014. They met in 2006 when Park became Jo's manager, and they began dating in 2009.

Filmography

Film

Television series

Discography

Awards and nominations

References

External links
 
 
 
 Jo Eun-ji at Cyworld 
 Jo Eun-ji at Prain TPC 

1981 births
Living people
South Korean film actresses
South Korean television actresses
21st-century South Korean actresses
Best Supporting Actress Paeksang Arts Award (film) winners